Norham is a village and civil parish in Northumberland, England, It is located  south-west of Berwick on the south side of the River Tweed where it is the border with Scotland.

History
Its ancient name was Ubbanford. Ecgred of Lindisfarne (d.845) replaced a wooden church with one of stone, translated the relics of St. Ceolwulf here. Norham is mentioned as the resting-place of St Cuthbert in the early eleventh century text On the Resting-Places of the Saints, and recent research has suggested the possibility that Norham (rather than Chester-le-Street or Durham) may have been the centre of the diocese of Lindisfarne from the ninth century until some time between 1013 and 1031.

It is the site of the 12th-century Norham Castle, and was for many years the centre for the Norhamshire exclave of County Durham.  It was transferred to Northumberland in 1844.

It was on the Tweed here that Edward I of England met the Scots nobility in 1292 to decide on the future king of Scotland.

Sir Walter Scott gained fame as a poet, particularly with Marmion set around the Battle of Flodden in 1513. It begins:

Day set on Norham's castled steep,
And Tweed's fair river, broad and deep,And Cheviot's mountains lone:The battled towers, the donjon keep,
The loophole grates where captives weep,
The flanking walls that round it sweep,
In yellow lustre shone.

The 19th-century Ladykirk and Norham Bridge is a late stone road bridge that connects the village with Ladykirk in the Scottish Borders.

J. M. W. Turner reportedly tipped his hat to Norham Castle in 1831, as it was the place which had brought him fame as an artist in 1798. It was a subject he revisited throughout his career. The painting of the castle which hangs in Tate Britain, Norham Castle, Sunrise (1845), luminously near-abstract, is one of the great treasures of the collection.

Norham railway station, built 1851, closed in 1965 and was turned into a museum by its final station master, Peter Short. In 2013 it was up for sale at an asking price of £420,000.

Governance
An electoral ward in the name of Norham and Islandshires exists. This ward stretches south east to just short of Bamburgh and has a total population taken at the 2011 Census of 4,438.

Popular culture 
Norham appears, under the name of Ubbanford, in The Bernicia Chronicles series of historical novels by Matthew Harffy, where it is the residence and seat of power of the series' protagonist, Beobrand.

See also 
Ladykirk and Norham Bridge
Norham Castle

References

External links

GENUKI (Accessed: 20 November 2008)

 
Villages in Northumberland
Populated places on the River Tweed
Civil parishes in Northumberland